SX, Sx, sx, or Sx may refer to:

In medicine 
 Sx, symptoms
 Sx, surgery

In music 
 SX (band), a Belgian indie pop band
 S-X (producer), a British producer and singer

In technology:
 .sx, the country code top-level domain for Sint Maarten
 Betacam SX, a type of videotape for Betacam
 1000BASE-SX, a fiber optic gigabit Ethernet standard
 MAN SX, a range of high mobility tactical trucks
 Parallax SX, a range of micro-controllers made by Ubicom
 NEC SX architecture of supercomputers

Other uses:
 SX News, a gay and lesbian newspaper in Australia
 Skybus Airlines (IATA airline code SX)
 AMA Supercross Championship, a form of off-road motorcycle racing
 Shanxi, a province of China (Guobiao abbreviation SX)
 Ŝ, a letter in the Esperanto alphabet

See also
 Sx Tape, a 2013 horror film
  Regulation S-X, regarding financial statements in the United States